was a Japanese-born Brazilian choral conductor and academic teacher based in the city of São Paulo. She was conductor of OSESP, the choir of the Orquestra Sinfônica do Estado de São Paulo, from 1995 to 2013, and then principal conductor of Coral Paulistano Mário de Andrade at the Municipal Theatre. She was among the choral conductors in South America who "have contributed to the strengthening and stimulation of choral music", according to The Cambridge Companion to Choral Music.

Life 
Munakata was born in Hiroshima, and the family moved to São Paulo, Brazil, when she was age two. She received piano lessons from age four and began singing in a choir that her father conducted at age seven. She also learned to play violin and harp. She studied at the Instituto Musical de São Paulo, graduating in composition and conducting in 1978. She studied conducting, musical analysis and counterpoint with Hans-Joachim Koellreutter. She also studied with Eleazar de Carvalho, Hugh Ross, Sérgio Magnani and John Neschling. She further studied with Eric Ericson in Sweden on a scholarship from Vitae Foundation, and was awarded a scholarship for studies of conducting at the University of Tokyo from the Japanese government in 1986. She received the award for best choral conductor from the São Paulo Association of Art Critics.

Munakata was teacher and director of the Escola Municipal de Música de São Paulo, and conductor and artistic director of the Coral Jovem do Estado, the state youth choir. She ran a regular radio program, "Vozes" (Voices) on Rádio Cultura FM in São Paulo, informing about choral music.

She was conductor of OSESP, the choir of the Orquestra Sinfônica do Estado de São Paulo, from 1995 to 2013, when she became the choir's Honorary Conductor. She taught at the faculties Faculdade Santa Marcelina and Faculdade de Artes Alcântara Machado (FAAM).

In the COVID-19 pandemic in Brazil, Munakata was hospitalized on 16 March 2020 at the Hospital Alemão Oswaldo Cruz with symptoms of the infection, and died on 26 March at the age 64.

Awards
She received the award for best choral conductor from the São Paulo Association of Art Critics.

References

External links 
 
 
 
 "Oh schöne Nacht" (Brahms) – gefeiertes Konzert des OSESP-Chors in Sao Paulo, dirigiert von Naomi Munakata. (in German) hart-brasilientexte.de

1955 births
2020 deaths
Musicians from Hiroshima
Brazilian musicians of Japanese descent
Brazilian conductors (music)
Naturalized citizens of Brazil
Women conductors (music)
Deaths from the COVID-19 pandemic in São Paulo (state)
Japanese emigrants to Brazil
20th-century conductors (music)
20th-century Brazilian musicians
20th-century women musicians
21st-century conductors (music)
21st-century Brazilian musicians
21st-century women musicians
Musicians from São Paulo